Addington is a major suburb of Christchurch, New Zealand.

As an inner city suburb, Addington has a mix of residential, retail and light industrial properties.

History

19th century

For the first decade after the founding of Christchurch in 1850, Addington was farmland, consisting of large rural sections. In the early 1860s, the railway was surveyed through the area and subdivision of the larger sections began. Factories moved in; wool and grain sheds opened; and with the industry came working class residential settlement. 

Development continued throughout the 19th century: the city's sale yards opened in 1874 and the railway workshops were moved to Addington in 1880. By the time the show grounds were opened in 1887, Addington had become an important suburb in the industrial and social life of Christchurch. In 1874 the Addington Prison was built in Lincoln Road; it closed in 1999 and the Mountfort cell block and remaining perimeter walls are a Heritage New Zealand Historic Place Category 2.

The suburb was named for the country residence of Archbishop John Sumner, one of the leading members of the Canterbury Association, and who was buried in St Mary's Church, Addington in England.

20th century

The New Zealand Railways Department's Addington Workshops were situated in Addington until their closure in the 1980s; the historic concrete water-tower survives, next to the new Christchurch railway station. The tower has served as the centrepoint for the adjacent Tower Junction shopping complex. The previous railway station is located on Moorhouse Avenue in neighbouring Sydenham.  The new station at Addington opened in 1994 and now serves the TranzAlpine, which takes tourists on the  coast-to-coast journey from Christchurch to Greymouth.
Addington was the home of the oldest blending plant in the Southern Hemisphere until it was demolished after sustaining some damage in the February 2011 Christchurch earthquake. The demolition of the plant sparked some controversy as the plant had been lined up to be carefully taken apart in an attempt to save Oregon timber valued at over $600,000.

Demographics
Addington comprises four statistical areas. Addington North is primarily industrial, with the Main South Line running through it. Addington West and Addington East are residential. Tower Junction has a shopping centre, Addington Racecourse, and light industry, and also includes two rest homes, which result in an unusually high median age for residents.

Residential areas
The residential areas of Addington, comprising the statistical areas of Addington West and Addington East cover .

The statistical areas of Addington West and Addington East had a population of 5,346 at the 2018 New Zealand census, an increase of 315 people (6.3%) since the 2013 census, and an increase of 1,059 people (24.7%) since the 2006 census. There were 1,986 households. There were 2,817 males and 2,529 females, giving a sex ratio of 1.11 males per female, with 696 people (13.0%) aged under 15 years, 1,548 (29.0%) aged 15 to 29, 2,505 (46.9%) aged 30 to 64, and 597 (11.2%) aged 65 or older.

Ethnicities were 60.4% European/Pākehā, 10.7% Māori, 4.5% Pacific peoples, 29.8% Asian, and 4.0% other ethnicities (totals add to more than 100% since people could identify with multiple ethnicities).

The proportion of people born overseas was 41.0%, compared with 27.1% nationally.

Although some people objected to giving their religion, 40.1% had no religion, 41.7% were Christian, 4.3% were Hindu, 2.1% were Muslim, 1.1% were Buddhist and 4.7% had other religions.

Of those at least 15 years old, 1,212 (26.1%) people had a bachelor or higher degree, and 780 (16.8%) people had no formal qualifications. The employment status of those at least 15 was that 2,544 (54.7%) people were employed full-time, 519 (11.2%) were part-time, and 183 (3.9%) were unemployed.

Addington North

Statistics New Zealand do not publish detailed statistics for areas of very low population.

Tower Junction

Tower Junction had a population of 120 at the 2018 New Zealand census, an increase of 81 people (207.7%) since the 2013 census, and an increase of 96 people (400.0%) since the 2006 census. There were 12 households. There were 42 males and 78 females, giving a sex ratio of 0.54 males per female. The median age was 80.6 years (compared with 37.4 years nationally), with 3 people (2.5%) aged under 15 years, 15 (12.5%) aged 15 to 29, 15 (12.5%) aged 30 to 64, and 84 (70.0%) aged 65 or older.

Ethnicities were 80.0% European/Pākehā, 2.5% Māori, 5.0% Pacific peoples, and 15.0% Asian (totals add to more than 100% since people could identify with multiple ethnicities).

The proportion of people born overseas was 30.0%, compared with 27.1% nationally.

Although some people objected to giving their religion, 22.5% had no religion, 70.0% were Christian and 2.5% had other religions.

Of those at least 15 years old, 12 (10.3%) people had a bachelor or higher degree, and 45 (38.5%) people had no formal qualifications. The median income was $22,500, compared with $31,800 nationally. The employment status of those at least 15 was that 24 (20.5%) people were employed full-time and 6 (5.1%) were part-time.

Economy

Tower Junction shopping centre is located in Addington, owned by Ngāi Tahu. It opened in 2002, and was redeveloped in 2018. It covers 37,000 m² and has 40 tenants, including Bunnings Warehouse and Harvey Norman.

Features

The suburb is home to multiple sporting and events complexes, including Horncastle Arena, Rugby League Park (currently branded as Orangetheory Stadium), and Addington Raceway. Along with Riccarton Racecourse, the Raceway is one of Christchurch's primary horse-racing venues, focusing predominantly on harness racing, and is the home to the annual New Zealand Trotting Cup.

Addington is also close to many other event venues, notably Hagley Park to the north and the Canterbury Agricultural Park to the southwest.

Central to Addington's residential area is St Mary's Anglican Church, which is a historic building surrounded by the spacious grounds and trees of Church Square. The grounds are used by the community for galas, pancake races (on Shrove Tuesday) fairs and weddings. The buildings and surrounding area is registered by Heritage New Zealand as a historic area, with registration number 7516.

The Court Theatre, whose buildings were damaged in the earthquake, relocated to "The Shed" and started operating on 10 December 2011.

Manuka Cottage is a community house that serves the interests of a wide variety of people and local community groups.

Education
Addington Te Kura Taumatua is a contributing primary school for years 1 to 6. It has a roll of  students. The school opened in 1881 as West Christchurch Side School.

Sacred Heart School is a Catholic state-integrated full primary school for years 1 to 8. It has a roll of  students. Sacred Heart opened in 1877.

References

Suburbs of Christchurch